Tell Teigen, or Trygve Teigen, 1923-1958 was an acrobat born in Høyanger, Norway.
His speciality was balancing on stacked chairs atop of masts over 35 meters tall. He performed without any form of safety provisions or nets, not wanting to detract from the audience's experience.
He performed all over the world, performing in the Opening Ceremonies of the Olympics in Helsinki in 1952.
Tell Teigen was engaged by the circus Ringling Brothers in the US.
He performed the first one-man show at Madison Square Gardens. During a performance in 1958, he fell from a high mast and was killed.

In 2001, Balanse, a documentary was produced about the life of Tell Teigen.

In 2008, a memorial was erected in his hometown of Høyanger, Norway designed by local artist Geir Hjetland.

References
 Tell Teigen på NRK
 Balanse

Acrobats
1923 births
1958 deaths
People from Høyanger
Norwegian expatriates in the United States